The Al-Ridha Forces are a Hezbollah-trained and organized pro-government Syrian militia. Its members belong to Syria's small Twelver Shia community, mainly from the Homs region. Its name refers to Shia Imam Ali al-Ridha

References

Hezbollah involvement in the Syrian civil war
Pro-government factions of the Syrian civil war
Military units and formations established in 2013
2013 establishments in Syria
Anti-ISIL factions in Syria
Shia Islamist groups
Syrian Shia organizations
Hezbollah
Jihadist groups in Syria